Eric Calder (born July 26, 1963) is a Canadian former professional ice hockey defenceman who played two games in the National Hockey League with the Washington Capitals. He was originally drafted by the Capitals in the 1981 NHL Entry Draft.

Prior to playing in the NHL, Calder became one of the youngest players to play for the Canadian junior team, as a 17-year-old, at the 1981 World Junior Ice Hockey Championships. He spent three seasons with the Cornwall Royals of the Quebec Major Junior Hockey League, winning the 1981 Memorial Cup as a member of the team.

After appearing in his two NHL games, Calder played a season of minor professional hockey with the Hershey Bears of the American Hockey League before returning to school, attending the Wilfrid Laurier University. While at Laurier, he was named an Ontario University Athletic Association all-star in 1986, 1987 and 1988 and a Canadian Interuniversity Athletics Union All-Canadian in 1988. Following graduation, Calder returned to the pro game, playing in France, Germany and England until retiring as a player in 1998.

He is currently head coach of the Waterloo Wolves Midget AAA team that plays in the Minor Hockey Alliance of Ontario.

References

External links

Profile at hockeydraftcentral.com

1963 births
Living people
Brest Albatros Hockey players
Canadian ice hockey defencemen
Chamonix HC players
Cornwall Royals (OHL) players
Cornwall Royals (QMJHL) players
Dragons de Rouen players
Fort Wayne Komets players
Hershey Bears players
Ice hockey people from Ontario
Manchester Storm (1995–2002) players
Schwenninger Wild Wings players
Sportspeople from Kitchener, Ontario
Washington Capitals draft picks
Washington Capitals players
Canadian expatriate ice hockey players in England
Canadian expatriate ice hockey players in Germany